Zona Zamfirova is a 2002 comedy-drama film directed by Zdravko Šotra. It is based on the 1906 book by Serbian author Stevan Sremac. The film contains the local vernacular of the Serbian dialect spoken in the region of Niš.

According to data from 2018, it is the most watched Serbian film ever, having been seen by a total of 1.2 million people in theatre release in Serbia.

The house used for the set of Zona's house is located in Pirot, and was built in 1848 by the wealthy merchant Hrista Jovanović. (see Old House, Pirot).

A sequel, Vrati se Zone, was released on January 24, 2017.

Plot 
Zona Zamfirova is set in the Serbian city of Niš in the 19th century. The plot follows the story of Zona Zamfirova (Katarina Radivojević), a local rich man's daughter, and the vicissitudes of her affair with Mane (Vojin Ćetković), an ordinary goldsmith. As it was undesirable for the daughter of a rich man to marry a craftsman, the two are at first divided, with the possibility of Zona marrying Manulać, who comes from a wealthy family. Everything is, however, changed as Mane organizes a successful conspiracy to keep Zona for himself.

Cast

References

External links 
 

2002 films
2002 comedy-drama films
2000s Serbian-language films
Serbian comedy-drama films
Films based on Serbian novels
Films set in Niš
Niš in fiction
Serbian romantic fiction
Films shot in Serbia
Films directed by Zdravko Šotra